Abdallán Guzmán Cruz (born 18 March 1954) is a Mexican politician affiliated with the Party of the Democratic Revolution. He served as Deputy of the LIX Legislature of the Mexican Congress representing Michoacán.

References

1954 births
Living people
Politicians from Michoacán
Party of the Democratic Revolution politicians
People from Zacapu
Universidad Michoacana de San Nicolás de Hidalgo alumni
21st-century Mexican politicians
Deputies of the LIX Legislature of Mexico
Members of the Chamber of Deputies (Mexico) for Michoacán